Michael A. Barry (born 1948, in New York) is a Princeton University professor and historian of the greater Middle East and Islamic world. Since 2004 he has taught as lecturer in Islamic Culture in Princeton's Department of Near Eastern Studies, in addition to serving as consultative chairman of the Department of Islamic Art at the Metropolitan Museum of Art (2005-2009) and special consultant to the Aga Khan Trust for Culture since 2009. An established authority on Islamic art and the history and culture of Afghanistan, on which subjects he has written extensively in both French and English, Barry's works include a standard French-language history of Afghanistan (Le Royaume de l'insolence), a biography of the late commander of the Afghan Northern Alliance, Ahmad Shah Massoud (Massoud: de l’islamisme à la liberté), which won France's Prix Femina in 2002, and an interpretive history of medieval Islamic figurative painting from the 15th to the 16th centuries (Figurative Art in Medieval Islam and the Riddle of Bihzâd of Herât (1465-1535)).

His most recent work is Kabul's Long Shadows published in 2011 by Princeton University's Liechtenstein Institute on Self-Determination (LISD). This monograph, which summarizes Barry's views on Afghanistan for the first time in English, addresses current U.S. policy toward Afghanistan in light of the country's political and cultural history, its tribal dynamics and the strategic concerns of the surrounding region.

Prior to coming to Princeton, Barry spent many years in Afghanistan with the International Federation for Human Rights, Médecins du Monde and the United Nations, working in often perilous conditions to provide and coordinate humanitarian assistance for the Afghan people from 1979 to 2001. He holds an A.B. in Near Eastern Studies from Princeton University, post-graduate degree in anthropology from Cambridge University, M.A. from McGill University and Ph.D. from the École des Hautes Études en Sciences Sociales in Paris.

References 
 Michael Barry's biography at Princeton University

External links
 Kabul's Long Shadows, 2011.
 Interview with Michael Barry in the Nassau Weekly, 2009.
 Article on Michael Barry in the Daily Princetonian, 2005.

1948 births
Princeton University alumni
Princeton University faculty
Middle Eastern studies in the United States
Prix Femina essai winners
Living people